Persona is the third studio album by Belgian singer Selah Sue, released on 25 March 2022 through Because Music. The album includes collaborations with Nigerian-Canadian rapper Tobi, Congolese-Belgian rapper Damso and American rapper Mick Jenkins. It was preceded by the singles "Free Fall", "Hurray" and "Pills".

Background
Sue said that with Persona she did not feel pressure to record as with her second album Reason (2015), and only began working on it when she felt she "could make something that [she] could fully support". The songs were inspired by a form of therapy Sue began before recording, called voice dialogue, which involves naming different aspects of one's own personality and learning to accept them "without judgment". Each song is told from the perspective of a different persona, with "Pills", for example, being sung by Sue's "apathetic self", "Hurray" from the dual personalities of "the critic and the attention seeker", and "All the Way Down" from the "inner reconciler", with Sue apologising to her sister.

Critical reception
Willem Jongeneelen, writing for Oor, felt that "not everything is as it seems" on the album, as Sue "sounds cheerful at times" but acknowledges that in the years between her second and third albums, she had to deal with "a lot" in her personal life. Elsewhere, Jongeneelen observed that Sue "sings and raps freely" and "apparently effortlessly slaloms past funky beats and warm atmospheric passages", ultimately concluding that it is "good to have her back".

Track listing

Charts

Weekly charts

Year-end charts

References

2022 albums
Because Music albums
Selah Sue albums